West Singhbhum or Pashchimi Singhbhum is one of the 24 districts of Jharkhand state, India. It came into existence on 16 January 1990, when the old Singhbhum district (then in Bihar) was bifurcated. Chaibasa is the district headquarters.

The district is bounded on north by Khunti district, on the east by Saraikela Kharsawan district of Jharkhand, on the southeast by Mayurbhanj district of Odisha, on the south by Kendujhar district of Odisha, and on the west by Simdega district of Jharkhand and Sundergarh district of Odisha.

History 
Several Iron slags, microlith, Potsherds have been discovered from Singhbhum district which are from 1400 BCE according to Carbon dating age.

West Singhbhum is one of the oldest districts of Jharkhand. After the British conquest of Kolhan in 1837, a new district was consequently constituted to be known as Singhbhum with Chaibasa as its headquarters. Subsequently, three districts, namely East Singhbhum, West Singhbhum and Seraikela Kharsawan have been carved out of erstwhile Singhbhum district.

West Singhbhum district came into existence when the old Singhbhum District bifurcated in 1990. With 9 community development blocks the Eastern part became East Singhbhum district with Jamshedpur as its headquarters and with remaining 23 blocks the larger Western part became West Singhbhum district with Chaibasa as its headquarters. In 2001 West Singhbhum again divided into two parts. With 8 blocks Saraikela-Kharsawan district came into existence. At present West Singhbhum remains with 18 blocks and three administrative sub-divisions.

There are several accounts relating to the origin of the name of the district:
According to one the name Singhbhum, or the land of "Singhs" has been derived from the patronymic of the Singh Rajas of Porahat, the junior branch of whom went on to found the ruling "Singh Deo" family of Saraikela State.
A second account suggests that the name is a corrupt form of the 'Singh Bonga' the principal deity of the district's tribal Bhumij-Munda population.

It is currently a part of the Red Corridor.

Geography 

"The Singhbhum region is possibly Earth's earliest continental land exposed to the air...."  Priyadarshi Chowdhury, a geologist at Australia's Monash University is an interesting recent discovery.

West Singhbhum district forms the Southern part of the newly created Jharkhand state and is the largest district in the state. The district spreads from 21.97°N to 23.60°N and from 85.00°E to 86.90°E. The district is situated at an average height of 244 metres above sea level and covers an area of 7629.679  km².

The district is covered with hills alternating with valleys, steep mountains, and deep forests on the mountain slopes. It contains some of the best Sal tree forests and the famous Saranda forest. There are plenty of waterfalls and a large variety of wild life like elephants, bison, tigers, leopards, bear, wild dogs and wild boars. Sambar Deer and spotted deer are also found but their numbers are decreasing in the forests adjoining inhabited areas.

Rivers
Following are some of the rivers flowing in the West Singhbhum District: Koel, Karo-Koina, Kuju, Kharkai, Sanjai, Roro, Deo, and Baitarini.

Mines and minerals 
The greater part of West Singhbhum district is covered with deposits of iron-ore used for iron and steel industry. Other industrially important minerals including the following:

 Chromite
 Magnetite
 Manganese
 Kainite
 Limestone
 Iron Ore
 Asbestos
 Soap-stone

Politics 

 |}

Administration

Blocks/Mandals 
West Singhbhum district consists of 18 Blocks. The following are the list of the Blocks in West Singhbhum district:

Demographics

According to the 2011 census West Singhbhum district has a population of 1,502,338, roughly equal to the nation of Gabon or the US state of Hawaii. This gives it a ranking of 335th in India (out of a total of 640). Its population growth rate over the decade 2001-2011 was 21.69%. Pashchimi Singhbhum has a sex ratio of 1004 females for every 1000 males, and a literacy rate of 59.54%. Scheduled Castes and Scheduled Tribes make up 3.8% and 67.3% of the population respectively.

According to the 2011 census, 28.22% of the population was made up of Hindus, 5.83% Christians and 2.54% Muslims. Other religions (mainly Sarna) made up 62.96% of the population.

At the time of the 2011 Census of India, 54.37% of the population in the district spoke Ho, 18.74% Odia, 9.16% Mundari, 4.64% Hindi, 2.53% Sadri, 2.08% Kurmali, 1.96% Urdu, 1.80% Bengali, 1.15% Kurukh and 1.03% Santali as their first language.

The majority of the population of West Singhbhum consists of Ho tribals.

Flora and fauna 
West Singhbhum district is full of dense forests and hills and harbors a variety of flora and fauna.

References

External links
West Singhbhum District Administration website

 
Districts of Jharkhand
1990 establishments in Bihar